Troy Garner (born February 15, 1978) is a former American soccer player who played for the Raleigh Express in the A-League.

Career statistics

Club

Notes

References

1978 births
Living people
Duke University alumni
American soccer players
United States men's youth international soccer players
Association football forwards
California Jaguars players
North Carolina Fusion U23 players